"San Francisco (Be Sure to Wear Flowers in Your Hair)" is an American pop music song, written by John Phillips, and sung by Scott McKenzie. It was produced and released in May 1967 by Phillips and Lou Adler, who used it to promote their Monterey International Pop Music Festival held in June of that year.

John Phillips played guitar on the recording and session musician Gary L. Coleman played orchestra bells and chimes. Bass guitar was supplied by session musician Joe Osborn. Hal Blaine played drums. The song reached the fourth position on the US charts and the number one spot on the UK charts.  In Ireland, it was number one for one week, in New Zealand the song spent five weeks at number one, and in Germany it was six weeks at number one.

McKenzie's version has been called "the unofficial anthem of the counterculture movement of the 1960s, including the Hippie, Anti-Vietnam War and Flower power movements." The song has also been widely regarded as a defining song of the Summer of Love along with the Beatles, "All You Need Is Love".

Composition
According to Paul Ingles of NPR, "...local authorities in Monterey were starting to get cold feet over the prospect of their town being overrun by hippies. To smooth things over, Phillips wrote a song, "San Francisco (Be Sure To Wear Flowers In Your Hair)."   Phillips reported writing the song in about 20 minutes. It is one of the first major hits in popular music industry to use vi–IV–I–V chord progression, a variant of I–V–vi–IV progression, which has seen enormous popularity in recent years, in pop music, as well as in orchestral music.

The song is credited with bringing thousands of young people to San Francisco during the late 1960s.

Different issues of the recording use slightly different titles, including: "San Francisco (Be Sure to Wear Flowers in Your Hair)"; "San Francisco (Be Sure to Wear Some Flowers in Your Hair)"; and "San Francisco 'Wear Some Flowers In Your Hair'".

Reception
Released on May 13, 1967, the song was an instant hit. By the week ending July 1, 1967, it reached the number four spot on the Billboard Hot 100 in the US, where it remained for four consecutive weeks. Meanwhile, the song rose to number one in the UK Singles Chart, and most of Europe.  In July 1967, McKenzie's previous record label, Capitol, claimed that the "follow-up" to this was their re-release of his earlier single, "Look in Your Eyes." The single is said to have sold over seven million copies worldwide. 

The song has been featured in several films, including Frantic, The Rock, and Forrest Gump. It was also played occasionally by Led Zeppelin as part of the improvised section in the middle of "Dazed and Confused". U2's Bono also led the audience in a sing-along during their PopMart performances in the San Francisco Bay Area on June 18 and 19, 1997. New Order covered it on July 11, 2014, at the Bill Graham Civic Auditorium in San Francisco. A cover by Michael Marshall appears in the 2019 film The Last Black Man in San Francisco.

Personnel
Scott McKenzie – double-tracked vocals, acoustic guitar
John Phillips – acoustic guitar, lead guitar, sitar, production
Joe Osborn – bass guitar
Gary L Coleman – orchestral bells and chimes
Hal Blaine – drums, percussion

Chart history

Weekly charts

Year-end charts

Johnny Hallyday version 

French singer Johnny Hallyday recorded the song in French, with the title "San Francisco".  His version reached number five in Wallonia (French Belgium) in 1967.

Track listings
7-inch single Philips B 370.454 F (1967)
 "San Francisco" (3:10)
 "Mon fils" (4:00)

7-inch EP Philips 437.380 BE (1967)
 A1. "San Francisco" (3:10)
 A2. "Fleurs d'amour et d'amitié" (2:39)
 B1. "Mon fils" (3:58)
 B2. "Psychédélic" (3:20)

Charts
 "San Francisco" / "Mon fils"

Other Covers
British band Psykick Holiday did a cover in 2017 to mark the 50th anniversary of the song. It was a double A-side single with Let's Go to San Francisco as the other track. The band also did a Summer of Love EP featuring a French & Spanish version of both songs.

In 2020 & 2022 the English tracks came out under main vocalist with the above band Vanessa White Smith on the Compilations "Femme Fatales of Music" Vol. 1 & 2. All releases were on Future Legend Records and out on iTunes.

See also
1967 in music
Best-selling singles worldwide
Counterculture of the 1960s
Summer of Love

References
Notes

Bibliography
 Guinness Book of British Hit Singles – 19th Edition – 
 The Book of Golden Discs – 2nd Edition –

External links
 

Scott McKenzie songs
Songs written by John Phillips (musician)
Songs about San Francisco
Songs about California
Songs about flowers
Songs about hippies
Hippie movement
Counterculture of the 1960s
Psychedelic pop songs
Johnny Hallyday songs
Petula Clark songs
Tanya Tucker songs
Global Deejays songs
Song recordings produced by Lou Adler
Irish Singles Chart number-one singles
UK Singles Chart number-one singles
Number-one singles in Finland
Number-one singles in Germany
Number-one singles in New Zealand
Number-one singles in Norway
Columbia Records singles
Philips Records singles
1967 singles
1967 songs
Ode Records singles